Thavapudhalavan is a 1972 Indian Tamil-language drama film directed by Muktha Srinivasan and produced by Muktha Ramaswamy. The film stars Sivaji Ganesan and K. R. Vijaya. It was released on 26 August 1972 and ran for 100 days to become a hit.

Plot

Cast 
Sivaji Ganesan as Nirmal
K. R. Vijaya as Vasanthi
Pandari Bai as Rajalakshmi
V. Gopalakrishnan as Eswaran
Ganthimathi as Eswari
M. R. R. Vasu as Jambu
Cho as James
Manorama as Pankajam
Senthamarai as Doctor
K. K. Soundar as Blindman
A. Sakunthala as Vimala
K. Kannan as Henchman
Thikkurissy Sukumaran Nair (guest appearance)
Vijayachandrika as Nurse

Production 
The inspiration for the lead character's evening blindness disease came from a friend of Srinivasan.

Soundtrack 
The music was composed by M. S. Viswanathan. Randor Guy wrote the English portions of "Love is Fine".

References

External links 
 

1970s Tamil-language films
1972 drama films
1972 films
Films about blind people in India
Films directed by Muktha Srinivasan
Films scored by M. S. Viswanathan
Indian drama films